Georgios Bonanos (1863–1940) was a Greek sculptor.

He was born in Lixouri, Kefalonia and studied in Athens School of Fine Arts. Leonidas Drosis was his professor. He made several statues and busts, placed all over Greece. He died in Athens.

Gallery

External links
 

1863 births
1940 deaths
Greek sculptors
People from Paliki
20th-century Greek sculptors
19th-century sculptors
19th-century Greek sculptors